The Ord of Caithness is a granite mass on the east coast of the Highland council area of Scotland, on the boundary of the counties Sutherland and Caithness. The A9 road passes above the Ord; there are sharp bends as it follows the contours.

History
Historically, "the grim barrier of the Ord guaranteed its [i.e. Caithness's] isolation, and travellers who passed that way were greatly impressed by the experience." It was described in the 1880s: "The old road over it, formerly the only land ingress to Caithness, traversed the crest of its stupendous seaward precipices at a height and in a manner most appalling to both man and beast... even the present road, formed in 1811... has very stiff gradients."

References

Headlands of Scotland
Caithness
Landforms of Highland (council area)